The 1998 United States Senate election in South Carolina was held November 3, 1998. Incumbent Democratic U.S. Senator Fritz Hollings won reelection to his seventh (his sixth full) term. , this is the last time that a Democrat has won a U.S. Senate election in South Carolina. This is also the last time the Democratic nominee for this Senate seat was a white man, as in future elections the Democrats would either nominate a woman, a person of color, or both.

Republican primary

Candidates 
 Stephen Brown, Greenville County Republican Party Chairman
 Bob Inglis, U.S. Representative
 Elton Legrand

Results

General election

Candidates 
 Ernest Hollings (D), incumbent U.S. Senator
 Bob Inglis (R), U.S. Representative
 Richard T. Quillian (L)

Campaign 
The race between Hollings and Inglis gave the voters a choice of two very different visions of and for South Carolina.  Hollings was from the Lowcountry, a face of the Old New South, and secured a large amount of federal funds for the state.  On the other hand, Inglis came from the Upstate, was a face of the New New South, and opposed to pork barrel spending.  Hollings viciously attacked Inglis on the campaign trail as a "goddamn skunk" and when Inglis requested that Hollings sign a pledge for campaign courtesy, Hollings replied that Inglis could "kiss his fanny."  Inglis tried to tie Hollings to President Clinton, who had been tainted by the Lewinsky scandal.

Ultimately, Hollings won the race for four crucial reasons.  First, Inglis refused to accept PAC donations which allowed Hollings to enjoy a huge financial advantage and blanket the state with his television advertisements.  Secondly, Inglis came from the Upstate which already provided GOP majorities whereas Hollings came from the Lowcountry which was a key tossup region in the state.  Thirdly, the voters two years prior in the 1996 Senate election had rewarded Strom Thurmond for his long service to the state and it was unlikely that they would then deny re-election to Hollings.  Finally, the 1998 South Carolina GOP ticket was dragged down with unpopular Governor David Beasley at the top of the ticket who would go on to lose his re-election campaign to Jim Hodges.

Polling

Results 

| 
| colspan=5 |Democratic hold

See also 
 List of United States senators from South Carolina
 1998 United States Senate elections
 1998 South Carolina gubernatorial election

References 

 
 
 

South Carolina
1998
United States Senate